Cyathostelma is a species of plants in the Apocynaceae first described as a genus in 1885. It contains only one known species, Cyathostelma latipes, endemic to Brazil.

formerly included
transferred to Jobinia
Cyathostelma furcatum E.Fourn. now a synonym of  Jobinia lindbergii E.Fourn..

References

Endemic flora of Brazil
Monotypic Apocynaceae genera
Asclepiadoideae